KZRC (96.1 FM) is a radio station licensed to Bennington, Oklahoma. The station broadcasts a hot adult contemporary format and is owned by Robert Sullins, through licensee Keystone Broadcasting Corporation.

References

External links
KZRC's official website

ZRC
Hot adult contemporary radio stations in the United States